Skins is a British teen drama created by father-and-son television writers Bryan Elsley and Jamie Brittain for Company Pictures. The fifth series began airing on E4 on 27 January 2011 and ended on 17 March 2011. This series sees the introduction of a new cast; it follows the lives of the third generation of sixth form students of Franky Fitzgerald, Rich Hardbeck, Grace Blood, Mini McGuinness, Liv Malone, Alo Creevey, and brothers Nick and Matty Levan.

Main cast

List of episodes

References

External links
List of 

Series 05
2011 British television seasons

de:Liste der Skins-Episoden